Huseyin Arslan from the University of South Florida Tampa, Florida, USA was named Fellow of the Institute of Electrical and Electronics Engineers (IEEE) in 2016 for contributions to spectrum sensing in cognitive radio networks. Arslan was among the 169 academic inventors identified by the US National Academy of Inventors (NAI) in 2022.

He is also serving as the Dean of the Faculty of Engineering and Natural Sciences at Istanbul Medipol University.

References

External links

20th-century births
Living people
Turkish engineering academics
University of South Florida faculty
Fellow Members of the IEEE
Year of birth missing (living people)
Place of birth missing (living people)